Mecklenburg County is a county in the Commonwealth of Virginia. As of the 2020 census, the population was 30,319. Its county seat is Boydton.

History
Mecklenburg County was organized on March 1, 1765, having split from Lunenburg County in 1764 as the result of the passage of an act by the Virginia General Assembly. Due to new settlement and population increases in the area, the legislature divided Lunenburg into three counties: Lunenburg, Charlotte County, and Mecklenburg. It was named after Charlotte of Mecklenburg-Strelitz, a British queen of German origin.

The first county government consisted of 13 members: Robert Munford, Richard Witton, John Speed, Henry Delony, Edmund Taylor, Benjamin Baird, John Camp, Thomas Erskine, John Potter, John Cox, Thomas Anderson, John Speed, Jr., and Samuel Hopkins, with Benjamin Baird acting as the first mayor.

Government
Mecklenburg County is governed by a nine-member Board of Supervisors, each elected from a single-member district. They serve as the county's legislative and policy body, enacting laws, ordinances, and taxes. They appoint a county administrator to conduct day-to-day operations. H. Wayne Carter, III is the current county administrator and Judy P. Sheffield is the current assistant county administrator.

The board members are:
 District 1 - Andy R. Hargrove
 District 2 - Glanzy M. Spain, Jr.―Vice Chairman
 District 3 - Tom Tanner
 District 4 - Claudia H. Lundy
 District 5 - Glenn E. Barbour—Chairman
 District 6 - Sterling Wilkinson
 District 7 - James D. Jennings
 District 8 - David A. Brankley
 District 9 - Charles Jones

Constitutional officers
Under the Virginia Constitution, each county and city in the state must install constitutional officers. Counties under the Traditional Form of Government must install all five officers. The majority of Virginia counties operate under the Traditional Form. Counties with the County Executive Form, Urban County Executive, or County Manager Plan of Government usually install just three (Clerk, Commonwealth Attorney, and Sheriff), opting for a Director of Finance appointed by the Board to take the place of the Commissioner of Revenue and Treasurer. Examples are Fairfax, Henrico and Prince William Counties. These officers are heads of their respective departments. They consist of:
 Clerk of Circuit Court - responsible for all circuit court records civil and criminal, along with all deeds, wills, plats and other records.
 Commonwealth's Attorney - responsible to represent the Commonwealth of Virginia in Mecklenburg County Court in all cases, chief prosecuting officer for their jurisdiction.
 Commissioner of Revenue - chief assessor of all real estate and personal property within the county, recommends a tax rate to the Board of Supervisors and maintains accurate real estate records for the Land Book.
 Treasurer - manages all finances within the county, helps prepare the budget for submission to the Board, and is responsible for the collection of all taxes.
 Sheriff - Chief law enforcement officer for their jurisdiction.

These offices are currently held by:
 Clerk of Court - Michelle Gordon
 Commonwealth Attorney - Allen Nash
 Commissioner of Revenue - Joseph E. (Ed) Taylor
 Treasurer - Sandra P. Langford
 Sheriff - Robert (Bobby) Hawkins

County departments and department heads
Listed below are the County facilities, the department housed in that facility and its head.
 Goode Bank Building
 Board of Supervisors (See Supervisor's List Above)
 County Administrator's Office- H. Wayne Carter, III (Administrator)
 Economic Development Director's  Office- Angela D. Kellett (Director)
 Tourism Office- Jacob P. Bower (Coordinator)
 Building Inspector's Office- Eddie Harris (Chief Inspector)
 Zoning Administrator's Office- Robert L. Hendrick (Zoning Administrator)
 Animal Warden's Office- Doug Blanton (Animal Warden)
 Information Technology Department (IT) - Alex Wells (IT Specialist)
 Courthouse
 Circuit Court-Leslie M. Osborn (Judge)
 Circuit Court Clerk's Office- Michelle Gordon (Clerk)
 Commonwealth Attorney's Office- J. Miller (Commonwealth's Attorney)
 Mark I. Burnett Building
 Commissioner of Revenue's Office- Joseph E. Taylor (Commissioner)
 Real Estate Department- Lisa C. Wagstaff (Chief Deputy Commissioner/Real Estate Assessor)
 Personal Property Department- Joseph E. Taylor (Commissioner)
 Treasurer's Office- Sandra P. Langford (Treasurer)
 VPI Extension Office- C. Taylor Clarke (Unit Coordinator/ANR Extension Agent)
 Hudgins Court Facility
 Social Services- Sandra S. Gregory (Director)
 General District Court- Charles Warren (Judge)
 General District Clerk's Office- Tammy T. Taylor (Clerk)
 Juvenile & Domestic Court- M. Rand (Judge), S. Anderson Nelson (Judge)
 J&D Court Clerk's Office- Rebecca D. Inge (Clerk)
 J&D Court Service Unit
 Sheriff's Office- R.W. (Bobby) Hawkins (Sheriff)
 911 Center
 911 Emergency Communications Office and Dispatch- Ben Duncan (Director)
 Jail
 Jail Division of the Sheriff's Office- Roosevelt Terry (Jail Captain)
 Post Office Building
 Piedmont Court Services- Jackie T. Boxley (Director)
 White Building
 Voter Registrar- Jason Corwin (General Registrar)

Politics

Education
The county's education department is the Mecklenburg County Public Schools. It is managed by the Board of Education. Paul Nichols is the County Schools Superintendent.

Geography

Adjacent counties
 Lunenburg County - north
 Brunswick County - east
 Warren County, North Carolina - southeast
 Vance County, North Carolina - south
 Granville County, North Carolina - southwest
 Halifax County - west
 Charlotte County - northwest

Major highways

Demographics

2020 census

Note: the US Census treats Hispanic/Latino as an ethnic category. This table excludes Latinos from the racial categories and assigns them to a separate category. Hispanics/Latinos can be of any race.

2010 Census
As of the census of 2010, there were 32,727 people, 12,951 households, and 8,962 families residing in the county. The population density was 52 people per square mile (20/km2). There were 17,403 housing units at an average density of 28 per square mile (11/km2). The racial makeup of the county was 59.24% White, 39.08% Black or African American, 0.21% Native American, 0.30% Asian, 0.01% Pacific Islander, 0.48% from other races, and 0.68% from two or more races. 1.21% of the population were Hispanic or Latino of any race.

There were 12,951 households, out of which 26.50% had children under the age of 18 living with them, 51.00% were married couples living together, 14.10% had a female householder with no husband present, and 30.80% were non-families. 27.20% of all households were made up of individuals, and 13.20% had someone living alone who was 65 years of age or older. The average household size was 2.38 and the average family size was 2.87.

In the county, the population was spread out, with 21.60% under the age of 18, 7.20% from 18 to 24, 27.40% from 25 to 44, 26.00% from 45 to 64, and 17.80% who were 65 years of age or older. The median age was 41 years. For every 100 females there were 97.30 males. For every 100 females age 18 and over, there were 96.50 males.

The median income for a household in the county was $31,380, and the median income for a family was $37,752. Males had a median income of $26,852 versus $19,609 for females. The per capita income for the county was $17,171. About 11.60% of families and 15.50% of the population were below the poverty line, including 20.60% of those under age 18 and 17.30% of those age 65 or over.

Communities

Towns
 Boydton (county seat)
 Brodnax (partial)
 Chase City
 Clarksville
 La Crosse
 South Hill

Census-designated places
 Baskerville
 Bracey
 Fairview
 Thynedale
 Union Level

Other unincorporated communities
 Buffalo Junction
 Nelson
 Palmer Springs
 Shiny Rock
 Skipwith

See also

 Mecklenburg County Sheriff's Office
 National Register of Historic Places listings in Mecklenburg County, Virginia

References

External links
 
 Official tourism site

 
Virginia counties
1765 establishments in Virginia